We All Fall Down is a 2000 Canadian drama film directed by Martin Cummins.

The film stars Darcy Belsher as Michael, a young man whose life enters a downward spiral after the death of his mother. The film's cast also includes Helen Shaver, Françoise Robertson, Nicholas Campbell, René Auberjonois, Barry Pepper, Mike Dopud and Ryan Reynolds.

Shaver won the Genie Award for Best Supporting Actress at the 21st Genie Awards.

References

External links 

2000 films
2000 drama films
Canadian drama films
English-language Canadian films
2000s English-language films
2000s Canadian films